The year 1732 in architecture involved some significant events.

Buildings and structures

Buildings

 August – York Assembly Rooms in England, designed by Lord Burlington, are opened. The Mansion House, York, is also completed this year.
 October 2 – Goodman's Fields Theatre, London, designed by Edward Shepherd, is opened.
 December 7 – Theatre Royal, Covent Garden, London, designed by Edward Shepherd, is opened.
 Trinity College Library in Dublin, designed by Thomas Burgh, is completed.
 Nicola Salvi begins work on the new Trevi Fountain in Rome.
 Work on Palais Rohan in Strasbourg, designed by Robert de Cotte, is started

Awards
 Prix de Rome, architecture: Jean-Laurent Legeay.

Births
 April 22 – John Johnson, English architect (died 1814)
 July 21 – James Adam, Scottish-born architect (died 1794)
 December 15 – Carl Gotthard Langhans, Prussian architect (died 1808)

Deaths
 Giacomo Amato, Sicilian architect (born 1643)

References

Architecture
Years in architecture
18th-century architecture